The Grêmio Recreativo Escola de Samba Unidos de Padre Miguel is a samba school of the city of Rio de Janeiro, being located on Rua Mesquita in the neighborhood of Padre Miguel. I came to present themselves among the great, in 1960, 1971 and 1972. After years in which they would wrap the flag gave back on top and Group A, in 2010. but with the addition made by LIERJ, where it originated the series to the school came to be a candidate for the title of this group.

Classifications

References

Samba schools of Rio de Janeiro
1957 establishments in Brazil